The 2019–20 season was Kisvárda FC's 2nd season in the OTP Bank Liga and the 17th in existence as a football club.

First team squad
As of 14 August 2019.

Transfers

Summer

In:

Out:

Winter

In:

Out:

Source:

Competitions

Overview

Nemzeti Bajnokság I

League table

Results summary

Results by round

Matches

Hungarian Cup

Statistics

Appearances and goals
Last updated on 27 June 2020.

|-
|colspan="14"|Youth players:
|-
|colspan="14"|Players no longer at the club:

|}

Top scorers
Includes all competitive matches. The list is sorted by shirt number when total goals are equal.
Last updated on 27 June 2020

Disciplinary record
Includes all competitive matches. Players with 1 card or more included only.

Last updated on 27 June 2020

Overall
{|class="wikitable"
|-
|Games played || 36 (33 OTP Bank Liga and 3 Hungarian Cup)
|-
|Games won || 14 (12 OTP Bank Liga and 2 Hungarian Cup)
|-
|Games drawn || 6 (6 OTP Bank Liga and 0 Hungarian Cup)
|-
|Games lost || 16 (15 OTP Bank Liga and 1 Hungarian Cup)
|-
|Goals scored || 45
|-
|Goals conceded || 45
|-
|Goal difference || 0
|-
|Yellow cards || 94
|-
|Red cards || 4
|-
|rowspan="1"|Worst discipline ||  Lucas (13 , 0 )
|-
|rowspan="1"|Best result || 5–1 (A) v Budapest Honvéd - Nemzeti Bajnokság I - 14-03-2020
|-
|rowspan="2"|Worst result || 1–4 (A) v Debrecen - Nemzeti Bajnokság I - 11-08-2019
|-
| 0–3 (A) v Fehérvár - Nemzeti Bajnokság I - 31-08-2019
|-
|rowspan="1"|Most appearances ||  Lucas (34 appearances)
|-
|rowspan="1"|Top scorer ||  Gheorghe Grozav (8 goals)
|-
|Points || 48/108 (44.44%)
|-

References

External links
 Official Website
 UEFA
 fixtures and results

Kisvárda FC seasons
Kisvárda